Larry Clark is an American film director.

Larry Clark may also refer to:

Larry Clark (filmmaker) (born 1948)
Larry Clark (Kentucky politician) (born 1945)
Larry Clark (musician), founding member of the rock band The Monks

See also
Laurence Clark (disambiguation)
Larry Clarke (1925–2015), Canadian businessman